Lukáš Mihálik may refer to:

 Lukáš Mihálik (footballer, born 1994), Slovak footballer for FC ViOn Zlaté Moravce
 Lukáš Mihálik (footballer, born 1997), Slovak footballer for Spartak Trnava